10 Things I Hate About You is an American television sitcom broadcast on ABC Family beginning in 2009. Developed by Carter Covington, the show is a half-hour, single-camera series based on the 1999 film of the same name. It premiered on Tuesday, July 7, 2009, at 8 pm. Following its initial 10-episode run, a second set of 10 episodes aired from March 29, 2010, to May 24, 2010. The series was cancelled in April 2010.

Plot

The series is based on 10 Things I Hate About You, which is itself based on William Shakespeare's The Taming of the Shrew. The Stratford sisters, Kat (Lindsey Shaw) and Bianca (Meaghan Martin), have just moved from Ohio to California. As they start at their new school (Padua High), they have very different goals. It's clear that one sister wants to stand out and the other just wants to fit in. Kat is a cool, smart, strong-willed, forthright feminist who is looking to save the world and get out of school as fast as she can. When she meets the intense Patrick Verona (Ethan Peck), sparks begin to fly. Bianca is a social butterfly whose main goal in life is to be popular, but when the head cheerleader makes her the mascot, she realizes she has a long way to go. As they start a bumpy year at Padua High, Kat and Bianca attempt to navigate the popular crowd, boys and their over-protective dad (Larry Miller). Bianca tries everything to be popular and become a cheerleader – although getting involved with the boyfriend (Chris Zylka) of the most popular girl in school (Dana Davis) creates new challenges.

Cast and characters

Main

 Lindsey Shaw as Katerina "Kat" Stratford: a high school junior and Bianca's older sister
 Meaghan Martin as Bianca Stratford: A sophomore and Kat's little sister
 Ethan Peck as Patrick Verona: a brooding high school junior who often gets into trouble
 Nicholas Braun as Cameron James: an awkward sophomore in love with Bianca
 Dana Davis as Chastity Church: a sophomore and the most popular girl in school
 Larry Miller as Dr. Walter Stratford: the girls' overprotective father

Recurring
 Allie Gonino as Michelle
 Chris Zylka as Joey Donner
 Kyle Kaplan as Michael Bernstein
 Ally Maki as Dawn
 Jolene Purdy as Mandella
 Suzy Nakamura as Principal Holland
 Leslie Grossman as Ms. Darlene Tharpe
 Barret Swatek as Ms. Somers
 Jack Salvatore Jr. as Brad
 Justin Lee as Charlie Woo
 Cody McMains as Keith
 Ashley Jackson as Tabitha Cook
 Benjamin Stone as William "Blank" Blankenship

Development and production
In 2008, ABC Family announced their intention to create a comedy pilot based on the 1999 movie. The pilot was written by Carter Covington, a self-professed fan of the film. ABC Family green-lit the comedy in October 2008. In November 2008, casting was announced for the pilot, with production following that fall. In February 2009, the pilot was picked up when ABC Family ordered 9 additional episodes.

While Covington sought a "reimagined" adaptation, there are several connections between the pilot and movie, which gave the pilot the same feel. Gil Junger, who directed the movie, also directed the pilot and served as series consultant. Richard Gibbs, who was credited for the original music in the 1999 movie, also composed the theme music for the pilot. In addition, Larry Miller reprised his role as the overprotective father, Walter Stratford. A cover of I Want You to Want Me by Cheap Trick (which was covered for the film by Letters to Cleo) was recorded by KSM. A music video was shot which featured members of the cast with KSM.

The pilot was shot at a high school in Tujunga, California. Due to budget constraints, future episodes were filmed at a soundstage in Santa Clarita, California, with only occasional external shots in Tujunga.

Covington served as the series' showrunner, as well as an executive producer. He stated that he wanted the show "to feel like a John Hughes film every week." Junger remained on board, and directed seven of the first 10 episodes of the series.

On April 29, 2010, executive producer Carter Covington announced on his Twitter account that the series had been canceled by ABC Family due to low ratings. He later revealed his intended storylines for the next season in an interview with Entertainment Weekly.

Episodes
20 episodes were produced, 12 of them directed by Gil Junger, who also directed the original film.

Release and Home media
The series library is available to stream in the United States on Hulu.

International

DVD

Reception

Critical response 
On the review aggregator website Rotten Tomatoes, the first season holds an approval rating of 88% based on 16 reviews, with an average rating of 6.90/10. The site's critics consensus reads, "10 Things I Hate About You manages to capture much of the same energy as the film it's based upon, thanks in part to a fantastic lead performance from Lindsey Shaw." On Metacritic, the first season of the show holds a score 66 out of 100 based on reviews from 9 critics, indicating "generally favorable reviews."

Brian Lowry of Variety described the show as "a solid roll for the cable network that was once an albatross around the neck of parent Disney". Randee Dawn of The Hollywood Reporter thought that the series "has genuine appeal". Mike Hale from The New York Times named the show to his top ten in 2009, stating that "in the dog days of July," the sitcom "may have been the best thing on television." Several critics praised the series for containing clever dialogue and appealing and rooted characters.

Alessandra Stanley of The New York Times called the series "not very inventive," and The New York Post, gave the show a mixed review concluding that the show is "silly, mindless fun" whose "actors are all terrific in that silly, mindless fun way that Disney teens tend to be."

Ratings 
The series premiere drew 1.60 million viewers, a record at that time for a 30-minute comedy debut on the ABC Family network.

Accolades 
Dana Davis received a nomination for Best Performance- Comedy at the 2010 NAMIC Vision Awards. Meaghan Martin received a nomination for Best Performance in a TV Series (Comedy or Drama) - Supporting Young Actress at the 2010 Young Artist Awards.

References

External links 

 

2009 American television series debuts
2010 American television series endings
2000s American high school television series
2010s American high school television series
2000s American single-camera sitcoms
2010s American single-camera sitcoms
2000s American teen sitcoms
2010s American teen sitcoms
ABC Family original programming
English-language television shows
Modern adaptations of works by William Shakespeare
Live action television shows based on films
Works based on The Taming of the Shrew
Television shows set in Los Angeles
Television series by Disney–ABC Domestic Television
Television series about teenagers